"6 Minutes of Pleasure" is the fifth and final single from LL Cool J's fourth album, Mama Said Knock You Out. It was released in 1991 for Def Jam Recordings and featured production from Marley Marl. "6 Minutes of Pleasure" was a mild success for LL Cool J, it made it to 95 on the Billboard Hot 100 and 26 on the Hot R&B/Hip-Hop songs. On the B-side was "Eat Em Up L Chill".

Track listing

A-side
"6 Minutes of Pleasure" (Hey Girl Remix) – 4:35 
"6 Minutes of Pleasure" (LP Version) – 4:30 
"6 Minutes of Pleasure" (Remix Instrumental) – 4:50

B-side
"Eat 'Em Up L Chill" (Chill Remix) – 5:01 
"Eat 'Em Up L Chill" (LP Version) – 4:43
"Eat 'Em Up L Chill" (Remix Instrumental) – 5:02

Charts

References

1990 songs
1991 singles
LL Cool J songs
Def Jam Recordings singles
Song recordings produced by Marley Marl
Songs written by LL Cool J
Songs written by Marley Marl